Colin is an English-language masculine given name. It has two distinct origins:
 A diminutive form of  "Colle", itself an Old French short form of the name Nicolas (Nicholas). This name, but not the anglicized Gaelic name, is also found in the spelling  Collin. This name is formed by the Old French diminutive -in also found in Robin.
 An anglicized form of the Gaelic name Cuilen, Cailean, modern Irish spelling  Coileáin, meaning "whelp, cub". The Old Irish word for "whelp", is cuilén. The Scottish Gaelic name is recorded in the spelling Colin from as early as the 14th century. MacCailean was a patronymic used by Clan Campbell, after Cailean Mór (d. 1296).

As a surname, Colin can be derived from the given name, but can also be of unrelated (French) origin.
The Irish patronymic Ó Coileáin gave rise to the surname Cullen (which is also the anglicization of the unrelated patronymic Ó Cuilinn).

In England and Wales, Colin was one of the Top 100 most commonly given male names for most of the 20th century but declined greatly at the end of the century and since.  It rose steadily from 96th in 1904 to 82nd in 1914, 61st in 1924, 26th in 1934 and 15th in 1944.  It then declined to 22nd in 1954, 25th in 1964, 44th in 1974 and 67th in 1984.  The decline then accelerated and Colin ranked 319th most popular name England and Wales in 1996 and 684th most popular in 2014. It has been moderately popular in the United States and was listed in the top 100 boys names in the U.S. in 2005. In Scotland it ranked 302 in 2014, but in Ireland it is more popular, ranking 88th in 2006.

In the US, Colin peaked in 2004 at rank 84, but has substantially declined since (rank 196 as of 2016). The form Collin reached the peak of its popularity somewhat earlier, at rank 115 in 1996, and has declined to rank 298 as of 2016. Taken together, the names Colin and Collin accounted for 0.16% (about 1 in 620) of boys named in the US in 2016, down from 0.4% (one in 250) in 2004.

People called Colin

Medieval and early modern

Cuilén mac Ildulb (died 971), King of Alba
Cailean Mór (died 1296), Scottish chief, progenitor of Clan Campbell
Colin Campbell, 1st Earl of Argyll (d. 1493)
Colin Campbell, 3rd Earl of Argyll (d. 1529)
Colin Campbell, 6th Earl of Argyll (d. 1584)

Modern

A–G
Colin Alevras, American restaurateur
Colin Baker (born 1943), British actor
Colin Bean, British actor
Colin Bell, multiple people
Colin Blakely, Irish actor
Colin Blanchard (born 1970), English paedophile convicted in the 2009 Plymouth child abuse case
Colin Bland, South African cricketer
Colin Blunstone, English singer from the Zombies
Colin Braun, American race car driver
Colin Burgess (musician) (born 1946), Australian Musician
Colin C. Berry, Canadian actor
Colin Calderwood, Scottish footballer, coach and manager
Colin Campbell Cooper, American Impressionist painter
Colin Campbell Mitchell, British Army lieutenant-colonel and politician
Colin Campbell, 1st Baron Clyde, (1792–1863) Scottish soldier
See Colin Campbell (disambiguation) for more people with this name
Colin Chapman, English founder of Lotus Cars
Colin Clark (disambiguation)
Colin Clive, British-American actor
Colin Coates (born 1946), Australian ice speed skater
Colin Cowdrey, English cricketer
Colin Cowherd, American sports radio personality
Colin Croft, West Indian cricketer
Colin Crouch, British political scientist
Colin Cunningham (swimmer), British swimmer
Colin Cunningham, American film and TV actor
Colin Dagba, French Footballer
Colin Davis, English conductor
Colin Delaney, American professional wrestler
Colin Edwards, American motorcycle racer
Colin Edwin, Australian musician
Colin Egglesfield, American actor
Colin Emerle, American musician
Colin Falvey, Irish footballer
Colin Farrell, Irish actor
Colin Ferguson, Canadian actor
Colin Ferguson (mass murderer), American mass murderer
Colin Firth (born 1960), British actor
Colin Fox (actor), Canadian actor
Colin Furze, British Youtuber
Colin Gardner (c. 1940–2010), English football official and philanthropist
Colin Greening, Canadian pro hockey player
Colin Greenwood, English bassist for rock band Radiohead
Colin Griffiths, English comedian

H–Z
Colin Hanks, American actor
Colin Hay (born 1953), Scottish-Australian lead singer of Men at Work
Colin Hendry (born 1965), Scottish footballer
Colin Holba (born 1994), American football player
Colin Huggins (born 1978), American classical pianist and busker
Colin Ireland, British serial killer
Colin Jackson, Welsh hurdler
Colin Jost, American comedian, screenwriter, and TV actor
Colin Kaepernick, American NFL football player
Colin Kelly, American aviator and war hero of the Second World War
Colin Kroll (died 2018), American internet entrepreneur
Colin Lane (born 1965), Australian comedian
Colin Mackenzie, (1754–1821), Scottish soldier and surveyor
See Colin Mackenzie (disambiguation) for more people with this name
Colin Maclaurin, Scottish mathematician
Colin Mason (1926–2020), New Zealand-Australian politician and writer
Colin Mathura-Jeffree, New Zealand actor/model/celebrity
Colin McAllister, Scottish interior designer and television presenter.
Colin McComb, American game designer
Colin McFarlane, English actor
Colin McGinn, British philosopher
Colin McRae (1968–2007), Scottish rally driver
Colin Meads, New Zealand rugby union player
Colin Meloy, American guitarist and singer in The Decemberists
Colin Milner Smith (1936–2020), English cricketer and judge
Colin Mochrie, Scottish Canadian actor/improv comedian
Colin Montgomerie, Scottish golfer
Colin Morgan, Irish actor
Colin Moulding, bassist and singer for band XTC
Colin Murdoch, New Zealand medical inventor
Colin Murray, British radio DJ and television presenter
Colin Needham, founder of the Internet Movie Database
Colin Newman, singer and guitarist for band Wire
Colin O'Donoghue, Irish actor
Colin Pillinger, British planetary scientist
Colin Powell (1937–2021), U.S. Secretary of State
Colin Quinn, American comedian
Colin Raston, Australian chemist and Ig Nobel Laureate
Colin Reitz, British long-distance runner
Colin Richardson, music producer
Colin P. Rourke, British mathematician
Colin Schooler (born 1997), American football player
Colin Slade, New Zealand rugby union player
Colin Stagg, the man wrongly imprisoned in the Rachel Nickell murder case
Colin Touchin, British musician and conductor
Colin Townsley, firefighter and George Medal recipient
Colin Thompson (disambiguation), multiple people
Colin Thorne (Professor) British academic leading the Blue-Green cities project
Colin Turnbull, sociologist and author
Colin Vearncombe, singer known as Black
Colin Ward, political writer
Colin Watkinson, British cinematographer
Colin Welland, British actor and screenwriter
 Colin West (born 1962), English football player and coach
 Colin West (author), English children book writer and illustrator 
 Colin West (footballer, born 1967), English football player
Colin Wilson, British writer
See Colin Wilson (disambiguation) for more people with this name
Colin Winter, bishop
Colin Winchester (1933–1989), assistant commissioner in the Australian Federal Police

Fictional characters
Colin, a character from the 1965 film Repulsion
Colin Creevey, a character from the Harry Potter series
 Colin Craven, a character from The Secret Garden by Frances Hodgson Burnett
 Colin Clout, fictional poetic folk figure, appearing first in the works of John Skelton and later in many works by Edmund Spenser
Colin, the titular character of the English comic series Colin the Vet
Colin Frater, a character from Ip Man 4: The Finale
Colin Mallory, a main character in the television series Sliders
Colin Robinson, a character from What We Do in the Shadows
 Colin, a character in the 2006 video game Need for Speed: Carbon
Colin, an anthropomorphic computer from Don't Hug Me I'm Scared

See also
Colin (surname)
Colin (disambiguation)
List of Scottish Gaelic given names
List of Irish-language given names
Collin (disambiguation)
Cullen (surname)
Cullinane (name)

References

Irish masculine given names
Scottish masculine given names
English masculine given names